The 2015 Liga Sudamericana de Básquetbol (LSB), or 2015 FIBA South American League, was the 20th edition of the Liga Sudamericana de Básquetbol competition, which is the second-tier South American professional basketball competition at the club level. It was organized by ABASU, which operates as a regional sub-zone of FIBA Americas.

Group stage

Group A
Host city: Mogi das Cruzes, Brazil

Group B
Host city: Bogotá, Colombia

Group C
Host city: Santiago, Chile

Group D
Host city: Quito, Ecuador

References

External links
Official website

Liga Sudamericana
2015